Hangzhou Sinobal Football Club (Chinese: 杭州赛搏足球俱乐部）is a Chinese semi-professional football club which formerly played in the Zhejiang Provincial and Hangzhou Municipal leagues; registered with both Hangzhou and Zhejiang Football Associations. The team is based in Hangzhou, Zhejiang, and their home stadium is the Xiacheng Stadium. Founded in 1998, their biggest achievements were winning several Zhejiang titles before they becoming national runner up for the Chinese amateur competition in 2000. Since 2006 the club has shifted its focus from amateur men's competition to developing youth Chinese talent and promoting the grassroots culture of the sport.

Current squad and staff

First team squad

Technical staff

External links
 Official Website.
 Official Website of CGF (China Grassroots Football) Sinobal's charitable foundation.

Football clubs in China